Vitalism is at the core of Jain philosophy which separates Jiva (soul or life) from Ajiva (non-soul). According to Jain cosmology, the whole universe is made up of six simple substances and is therefore eternal. These six substances (dravya) are:
Jiva
Time
Space
Dharma (medium of motion)
Adharma
Matter (Pudgala)

Jiva or soul is distinguished from the rest five (termed Ajiva) on account of the quality of intelligence with which it is endowed and of which the other substances are devoid.

Overview 

According to Jainism, there are ten  or life-principles:

According to major Jain text, Tattvarthsutra: "The severance of vitalities out of passion is injury".
Because life is to be considered sacred and in every living thing, Jains avoid killing any living creature. They are not only vegetarian, but decline to eat vegetables that grow under the ground because each underground stem contains infinite number of vitalities each of that can potentially grow into full-fledged plants.
The table below summarizes the vitalities that living beings possess in accordance with their senses:

See also
Jain philosophy
Ajiva
Pudgal

References 

Jain philosophical concepts